Trachischium apteii  is a species of colubrid snake, which is endemic to India.

References

Trachischium
Reptiles described in 2019
Reptiles of India